"I Love to Love (But My Baby Loves to Dance)" is a song by British singer Tina Charles, released in 1976 as the second single from her debut album, I Love to Love. The song was composed by Jack Robinson and James Bolden. The track was an international success both upon its original 1976 release and also when - remixed by the DMC (Disco Mix Club) - it was reissued ten years later (the DMC version features the instrumental "Sunburn" by the Biddu Orchestra as its B-side).

Background
Charles had already been recording for seven years and had sung lead on the international hit "I'm on Fire" by 5000 Volts (1975), but her contribution was unacknowledged, with Luan Peters cited as vocalist in promotion for the group. It was through a mutual friend, singer Lee Vanderbilt, that Charles met record producer Biddu who encouraged her to record  "I Love to Love (But My Baby Loves to Dance)", utilizing Manchester musicians Richie Close (keyboard), Clive Allen (guitar), Des Browne (bass) and Tom Daley (percussion) to create a signature hit sound for Charles. 

"I Love to Love..." was an international hit, reaching #1 in Ireland, #2 in France, the Netherlands, Norway, Portugal and Sweden while in Austria, Germany and Spain the single peaked at respectively #20, #6 and #3. The track was also a hit in Australia (#6) and New Zealand (#7). In Canada "I Love to Love..." won the Juno for bestselling international single for the year 1976 having sold over 200,000 copies in the province of Quebec. 

The British television series River used this song at the start and end of the first episode and at the end of the last episode.

Track listings
 7" single
 "I Love to Love" — 3:02
 "Disco Fever" — 4:12

Other versions
Versions of "I Love to Love (But My Baby Loves to Dance)" include:

"Jag gillar dans" (Swedish) by Siw Malmkvist/ Explosiw album (1976)
"I Love to Love" by Björk (1976)
"Saisinpa vain" (Finnish) by Vicky/ single release - parent album 1-2-3-4-Tulta! (1976)
"Mun beibi ei haluu" (Finnish) by CatCat/ CatCat album (1992)
Edson Cordeiro. Album Disco Clubbing ao Vivo (1998)
"Mám ráda tvůj smích" (Czech) by Jana Kratochvílová

Charts and sales

Weekly charts

1 Remix

Year-end charts

Certifications

See also
 List of UK Singles Chart number ones of the 1970s

References

1976 songs
1976 singles
1986 singles
Irish Singles Chart number-one singles
UK Singles Chart number-one singles
Tina Charles (singer) songs
Songs about dancing
Songs written by Jack Robinson (songwriter)
CBS Records singles
Siw Malmkvist songs